Dorak is a village in Tarsus district of Mersin Province, Turkey. The population of village is 231  as of 2011.

References

Villages in Tarsus District